Dorsett Terrell Davis (born January 24, 1979, in Shelby, Mississippi) is a former American football defensive end of the National Football League. He was drafted by the Denver Broncos in the third round of the 2002 NFL Draft. He played college football at Mississippi State.

Davis also played for the Edmonton Eskimos.

Since his playing career ended, Davis has coached at Mississippi Gulf Coast Community College, Mississippi Valley State University, and Jackson State University.

References 

1979 births
Living people
People from Shelby, Mississippi
American football defensive ends
American football defensive tackles
American players of Canadian football
Canadian football defensive linemen
Mississippi Delta Trojans football players
Mississippi State Bulldogs football players
Denver Broncos players
Edmonton Elks players